Arrow Rock State Historic Site is an open-air museum encompassing a geographic formation and a portion of the village of Arrow Rock, Missouri.  The park is part of the Arrow Rock Historic District, a National Historic Landmark, and commemorates the history of the area as a key stop on the Santa Fe Trail.

A visitor center museum features exhibits about Arrow Rock and the Boone's Lick country. The Bingham Home, built by artist George Caleb Bingham, is a historic house museum furnished as in the 1880s. The 1834 Huston Tavern is a restaurant. A walking tour of the site includes the old courthouse, town doctor's home, stone jail, and other historic buildings.  The park's amenities also include camping facilities and hiking trails.

The bridge and shelters were listed on the National Register of Historic Places in 1985.

Works Progress Administration works at Arrow Rock State Historic Site
Works Progress Administration works at Arrow Rock State Historic Site, near Arrow Rock, Missouri, are works built by Works Progress Administration workers during 1934 to 1937.  These include:
Arrow Rock State Historic Site Bridge, at Arrow Rock State Historic Site, southeast of Arrow Rock, Missouri (National Park Service and Works Progress Administration), NRHP-listed.  It is a three arch span stone bridge.
Arrow Rock State Historic Site Grave Shelter, Arrow Rock State Historic Site, southeast of Arrow Rock, Missouri (National Park Service and Works Progress Administration), NRHP-listed
Arrow Rock State Historic Site Lookout Shelter, Arrow Rock State Historic Site, east of Arrow Rock, Missouri (National Park Service and Works Progress Administration), NRHP-listed
Arrow Rock State Historic Site Open Shelter

References

External links
Arrow Rock State Historic Site

Road bridges on the National Register of Historic Places in Missouri
Buildings and structures completed in 1937
Buildings and structures in Saline County, Missouri
Works Progress Administration in Missouri
National Register of Historic Places in Saline County, Missouri
Missouri State Historic Sites
Protected areas established in 1923
Museums in Saline County, Missouri
Open-air museums in Missouri
1923 establishments in Missouri
Stone arch bridges in the United States